Greenbanks is a hamlet and semi-rural locality of Murray Bridge on the east (left) bank of the Murray River. It is sandwiched between the larger east-bank localities of Willow Banks, on the west, and Sunnyside on the east. Greenbanks Drive is the only road within the locality, and is accessible only via Clifftop Drive, Sunnyside or Sunnyside Road.

References 

Towns in South Australia